The Less is More Tour is the second headlining concert tour by British recording artist Natasha Bedingfield. Primarily visiting the United States, the tour will support the singer's third studio album, Strip Me. Joining Bedingfield on tour will be American recording artists, Andy Grammer, Kevin Hammond, and Kate Voegele, who previously supported Bedingfield on her Verizon VIP Tour (2009). The Less Is More tour is an "intimate" experience, and was to begin in Western Massachusetts on 5 June 2011 and was set to end in South Florida on 16 July 2011.

Background
The tour was announced on Bedingfield's official website on 20 April 2011, concurrent with the release of her third single "Weightless". Sponsored by Freschetta, the tour will primarily visit the United States in the summer of 2011. The singer describes the tour as a "stripped down set in an intimate setting". Bedingfield plans to perform tracks from her latest LP, along with a few of her hits to an acoustic sound. The singer will perform in nightclubs and theatres to provide the concerts the intimate feeling she desires. Singer-songwriter Kate Voegele (who opened for Bedingfield on her previous outing), will join Bedingfield at select concerts. Newcomers to the music scene, Andy Grammer and Kevin Hammond, will also serve as the opening acts.  During a recent interview, Bedingfield expressed her desire to work with Victoria Beckham. She stated she would like Beckham to design the costumes for her to wear on tour.
To introduce the tour, Bedingfield stated, "I'm so excited and ready to go back on tour in the U.S. to celebrate this new album. I always find inspiration in performing for my fans. […]There's just something about being on the road and singing my songs live that is refreshing. It reminds me of why this is what I absolutely love."

Critical reception 
Dave McKenna from The Washington Post gave the tour a mixed to negative review commenting that Bedingfield's Brit Pop proves that "less is not always more." In his review, McKenna felt that the show gets off to a slow start, but that there were good moments e.g. the show coming to life when she sings "Try" and Bedingfield's bombastic cover of "Purple Rain." He concluded that "Bedingfield then left her fans wanting more, not less." Marc Hirsh from The Boston Globe noted that Bedingfield struggled to fill "a modest-sized theatre" at her show in Somerville, but said that Bedingfield had the last laugh as he performance was strong enough to rub in their faces. Amongst Hirsh's positive comments was praise for the four-piece band, whom Hirsh said "[successfully] backed [Bedingfield] without extraneous frills but still managed to offer plenty of color."

Opening acts
Andy Grammer
Kevin Hammond (Philadelphia, Minneapolis and Myrtle Beach)
Kate Voegele (select dates)

Setlist
"Neon Lights"
"Little Too Much"
"These Words"
"All I Need"
"Message in a Bottle"
"Single"
"I Bruise Easily"
"Strip Me"
"Run-Run-Run"
"Can't Fall Down"
"Angel" 
"Soulmate"
"Wild Horses"
"Try"
"Purple Rain"
"Pocketful of Sunshine" (contains excerpts from "We're All Mad")
"Love Like This"
"Put Your Arms Around Me"
"Weightless"
"Recover"
"Unwritten"
Source:

Additional notes
During the concert in New York City, Bedingfield performed "Hot in Herre", "Single Ladies (Put a Ring on It)" and "Hold It Against Me".
During the concert in Alexandria, Bedingfield performed "What's My Name?" and "Sex on Fire".
During the concert in Minneapolis, Bedingfield performed "Smooth Operator". The song was also performed in Seattle and Fort Lauderdale.
During the concert in Seattle, Bedingfield performed  "Big Yellow Taxi".
During the concert in Los Angeles, Bedingfield performed "What's My Name?", "Single Ladies (Put a Ring on It)" and "Let It Rock".
During the concert in Anaheim, Bedingfield performed "Baby Mine".
During the concert in Tampa, Bedingfield performed "Ray of Light.

Tour dates

Festivals and other miscellaneous performances
This concert is a part of the "Nighfall on the River" concert series

External links
Bedingfield's Official Website

References

Natasha Bedingfield
2011 concert tours